K.G. Subramanyan, a Retrospective is a book by R. Siva Kumar, released on the occasion of the fourth and largest retrospective show of K.G. Subramanyan, which was curated by R. Siva Kumar at the National Gallery of Modern Art.

The exhibition consisted of 300 paintings including  terracotta reliefs, reverse paintings on glass and acrylic, linocuts, lithographs, etching, silkscreens, drawings, studies, children's books, toys and saras-paintings on terracotta platters-and the photographs of murals. and the range of materials includes terracotta, glass, paper, wood porcelain and metal cement.

The book offers an insight into the creative processes of K.G. Subramanyan. While tracing the various aspects of his creativity, the book provides the influences that shaped him and gives a kaleidoscopic view of his six-decade long artistic journey from Kerala, Mahe, Santiniketan, Slade School in England, and later in various cities of Europe and America.

This book features as a part of the syllabus of  Modern South Asian art at various universities.

References

Art history books
Books by R. Siva Kumar
Case studies
Works about art genres
2010 non-fiction books